Melchior Schjelderup Olsson Fuhr (1790–1869) was a Norwegian politician.

He was elected to the Norwegian Parliament in 1836 and 1842, representing the rural constituency of Nordre Bergenhus Amt (today named Sogn og Fjordane). He worked as a farmer. He was also a deputy representative in 1839.

He hailed from Luster, and became the first mayor of Luster in 1837.

References

1790 births
1869 deaths
Members of the Storting
Mayors of places in Sogn og Fjordane
Norwegian people of Swedish descent